Charopinesta is a genus of three species of tiny pinhead or dot snails that are endemic to Australia's Lord Howe Island in the Tasman Sea.

Species
 Charopinesta goweri Iredale, 1944 – Mount Gower pinhead snail
 Charopinesta sema Iredale, 1944 – Blackburn Island pinhead snail
 Charopinesta suavis Iredale, 1944 – sweet pinhead snail

References

 
 

 
 
Gastropod genera
Taxa named by Tom Iredale
Gastropods described in 1944
Gastropods of Lord Howe Island